Heuchera hirsutissima is a species of flowering plant in the saxifrage family known by the common name shaggy-haired alumroot.

Distribution
The perennial is endemic to the San Jacinto Mountains of Riverside County, California, where it grows on rocky slopes.

While uncommon in the wild, this species is cultivated as an attractive garden flower and ornamental plant.

Description
Heuchera hirsutissima is a rhizomatous perennial herb with small, lobed, rounded leaves.

It produces an erect, hairy inflorescence which bears light pink flowers.

External links
Jepson Manual Treatment of Heuchera hirsutissima
Heuchera hirsutissima — UC Photo gallery

hirsutissima
Endemic flora of California
Flora of Riverside County, California
Natural history of the California chaparral and woodlands
Natural history of the Peninsular Ranges
Flora and fauna of the San Jacinto Mountains
Garden plants of North America
Plants described in 1936
Flora without expected TNC conservation status